Eulimosina is a genus of flies belonging to the family Lesser Dung flies.

Species
E. ochripes (Meigen, 1830)
E. dudai (Papp, 1978)
E. oroszi Papp, 2008

References

Sphaeroceridae
Diptera of Asia
Diptera of Europe
Brachycera genera